The Choate Department Store is a historic commercial building in Winona, Minnesota, United States.  It was built in 1881 for Hannibal Choate (1835–1923), an early Winona-based merchant who achieved such regional prominence that he became known as the "merchant prince of southeastern Minnesota".  The building was listed on the National Register of Historic Places in 1976 for its local significance in the theme of commerce.  It was nominated for its associations with Choate, who pioneered fixed price retail and in-store merchandise displays in the region, and boosted his bottom line by wholesaling to other merchants.

In 1998 the store was also included as a contributing property of the Winona Commercial Historic District.

See also
 National Register of Historic Places listings in Winona County, Minnesota

References

External links

1881 establishments in Minnesota
Buildings and structures in Winona, Minnesota
Commercial buildings completed in 1881
Commercial buildings on the National Register of Historic Places in Minnesota
Individually listed contributing properties to historic districts on the National Register in Minnesota
National Register of Historic Places in Winona County, Minnesota
Romanesque Revival architecture in Minnesota